Frontier Badmen is a 1943 American Western film directed by Ford Beebe and starring Robert Paige, Anne Gwynne and Diana Barrymore. It was produced and distributed by Universal Pictures. Several members of the cast are offspring of silent screen stars including Noah Beery Jr., Lon Chaney Jr. and Diana Barrymore.

Plot
A Texas cattle rancher (Robert Paige) and his sidekick (Noah Beery, Jr.) break up a buying monopoly in Kansas.

Cast
 Robert Paige as Steve Logan
 Anne Gwynne as Chris Prentice
 Noah Beery, Jr. as Jim Cardwell
 Diana Barrymore as Claire
 Leo Carillo as Chinito Galvez
 Andy Devine as Slim ; Cowhand
 Lon Chaney, Jr. as Chango
 Thomas Gomez as Ballard
 Frank Lackteen as Cherokee
 William Farnum as Dad Courtwright

References

External links
Frontier Badmen @ IMDb.com
lobby poster

1943 films
Universal Pictures films
Films directed by Ford Beebe
1943 Western (genre) films
American Western (genre) films
American black-and-white films
1940s American films
1940s English-language films